Norra Fågelås is a village near Skara in Hjo Municipality (Hjo kommun), Sweden.

Populated places in Västra Götaland County